1 California, California One, 1st California, California First, or variant thereof, may refer to:
 1 California (bus line), a trolleybus line in San Francisco
 One California, San Francisco office building
 One California Plaza, Los Angeles office building
 OneCalifornia Bank, bank
 OneCalifornia, political opposition group to Six Californias

California 1
 California State Route 1

1st California
 First California Mortgage
 California Battalion
 1st California Infantry
 1st Regiment California Volunteer Cavalry
 1st California Veteran Infantry Battalion
 1st Battalion of Native Cavalry, California Volunteers

California 1st
 California's 1st district (disambiguation)
 California's 1st congressional district
 California's 1st State Assembly district
 California's 1st State Senate district

See also
 California (disambiguation)